Gary Corby is an Australian author of historical mysteries set in the world of Classical Greece.

His novels feature historical figures from the time as recurring characters, notably Socrates, Pericles, and the priestess Diotima of Mantinea.  The series hero is a fictional detective/agent named Nicolaos; the heroine is Diotima.

Published works

The Athenian Mysteries
The Pericles Commission (2010) 
The Ionia Sanction (2011) 
Sacred Games (2013) 
The Marathon Conspiracy (2014) 
Death ex Machina (2015) 
The Singer from Memphis (2016) 
Death on Delos (2017)

Awards and nominations 
 Nominated for the Ned Kelly Award for Best First Novel in 2010, for The Pericles Commission.
 Winner of the 2008 Arthur Conan Doyle Prize for new fiction in the historical mystery category for the short story The Pasion Contract.

References

External links 
 A Dead Man Fell from the Sky.  Official website and blog.

1963 births
21st-century Australian novelists
Australian male novelists
Australian mystery writers
Australian historical novelists
Living people
Writers of historical fiction set in antiquity
Writers of historical mysteries
21st-century Australian male writers